Maurice Edward Frank Dunkley (19 February 1914 – 27 December 1989) was an English footballer, who played as a winger in the Football League for Northampton Town and Manchester City. He also played first-class cricket for Northamptonshire in 36 matches between 1937 and 1939.

References

1914 births
1989 deaths
English cricketers
Northamptonshire cricketers
Manchester City F.C. players
Sportspeople from Kettering
Association football wingers
Northampton Town F.C. players
Kettering Town F.C. players
Corby Town F.C. players
English Football League players
English footballers